The 2017 World Junior Wrestling Championships were the 41st edition of the World Junior Wrestling Championships and were held in Tampere, Finland between 1 and 6 August 2017.

Medal table

Team ranking

Medal summary

Men's freestyle

Men's Greco-Roman

Women's freestyle

References

World Junior Championships
Wrestling Championships
International wrestling competitions hosted by Finland
Sport in Tampere
Wrestling in Finland
World Junior Wrestling Championships